Piz Gannaretsch is a mountain in the Lepontine Alps, overlooking Sedrun in Graubünden. At 3,040 metres above sea level, its summit is the highest point of the range lying between St Gotthard Pass and Lukmanier Pass. The massif of Piz Gannaretsch separates the valleys of Lake Nalps (west) and Lake Sontga Maria (east).

A glacier named Glatscher da Gannaretsch lies over the north-western flanks of Piz Gannaretsch.

References

External links
Piz Gannaretsch on Hikr.org

Mountains of Switzerland
Mountains of Graubünden
Mountains of the Alps
Alpine three-thousanders
Lepontine Alps
Medel (Lucmagn)
Tujetsch